Cornelius Kevin O'Callaghan (1922 – 24 January 1974) was an Irish Fianna Fáil politician. He stood for election to Dáil Éireann as a Fianna Fáil candidate for the Cork North constituency at the 1951 general election but was unsuccessful. He was elected to Seanad Éireann to the Agricultural Panel at a by-election on 24 February 1970. He was re-elected at the 1973 Seanad election. He died in 1974 during the 13th Seanad.

References

1922 births
1974 deaths
Fianna Fáil senators
Members of the 12th Seanad
Members of the 13th Seanad
Politicians from County Cork